The Oshkosh Giants were a minor league baseball team based in Oshkosh, Wisconsin that played between 1941 and 1953 in the Wisconsin State League.

Notable alumni

 Hank Bauer (1941) 3 x MLB All-Star

Dave Garcia (1949-1950, MGR)

Fred Schulte (1941-1942, MGR)

 Bob Schmidt (1952) MLB All-Star

References

External links
Baseball Reference

Defunct minor league baseball teams
Baseball teams established in 1886
Baseball teams disestablished in 1953
1886 establishments in Wisconsin
1953 disestablishments in Wisconsin
Wisconsin State League teams
Wisconsin-Illinois League teams
Wisconsin-Michigan League teams
Northwestern League teams
Professional baseball teams in Wisconsin
New York Giants minor league affiliates
Defunct baseball teams in Wisconsin
Sports in Oshkosh, Wisconsin